Meschugge (English title: The Giraffe) is a 1998 German thriller film directed by Dani Levy and set during World War II. The German title roughly translates as "crazy". The English title refers to the nickname of a character who was once in charge of the Treblinka extermination camp. The film features mainly English dialogue, though it features German dialogue as well.

Cast
Maria Schrader as Lena Katz
Lukas Ammann as Eliah Goldberg
Lynn Cohen as Mrs. Fish
Dani Levy as David Fish
David Strathairn as  Charles Kaminski
Nicole Heesters as Lena's mother

Reception
Variety gave a mixed review, calling the film "slickly shot" though criticising the plot and dialogue as "ordinary". The New York Times was much more critical, stating the English dialogue seemed like "badly translated German" and the plots "breathless incoherence [was] matched only by its wild implausibility."

References

External links
 
 

1998 films
German thriller films
1990s German-language films
1990s English-language films
English-language German films
Films set in the United States
Films directed by Dani Levy
1990s thriller films
1998 multilingual films
German multilingual films
1990s German films